Pat Hegarty (born 1973) is an Irish retired Gaelic footballer. His league and championship career with the Cork senior team lasted from 1993 until 1998.

Hegarty made his debut on the inter-county scene at the age of sixteen when he was selected for the Cork minor team. He enjoyed two championship seasons with the minor team, culminating with the winning of an All-Ireland medal in 1991. Hegarty subsequently joined the Cork under-21, winning an All-Ireland medal in 1994. By this stage he had joined the Cork senior team after being added to the panel during the 1991 championship. An All-Ireland runner-up in 1993, Hegarty won three Munster medals.

Honours

Cork
 Munster Senior Football Championship (3): 1993, 1994, 1995
 Munster Junior Football Championship (1): 1992
 All-Ireland Under-21 Football Championship (1): 1994
 Munster Under-21 Football Championship (1): 1994
 All-Ireland Minor Football Championship (1): 1991
 Munster Minor Football Championship (1): 1991

References

1973 births
Living people
Tadhg Mac Cárthaigh's Gaelic footballers
Cork inter-county Gaelic footballers